"Are You My Mummy?" is the 13th broadcast episode of the animated television series Phineas and Ferb. The episode sees stepbrothers Phineas and Ferb going to an Egyptian-themed theater where they become inspired to befriend a mummy they believe is being kept in the theater basement. They confuse the mummy for their sister Candace, who was accidentally wrapped up in toilet paper. Meanwhile, Dr. Doofenshmirtz tries to blow up a beaver dam in order to make his property beachfront.

"Are You My Mummy?" was written by series co-creators Dan Povenmire and Jeff "Swampy" Marsh, along with Bobby Gaylor and Martin Olson, and directed by Povenmire. The episode originally aired on Disney Channel in the United States on February 15, 2008, as part of the month-long marathon event "Phineas and Ferb-urary." Critical reception for the episode was generally favorable. The featured song, "My Undead Mummy and Me," was also well received and became available on the official Phineas and Ferb soundtrack in 2009.

Voice cast
 Vincent Martella as Phineas Flynn, Additional Voices
 Thomas Sangster as Ferb Fletcher
 Ashley Tisdale as Candace Flynn, Additional Voices
 Richard O'Brien as Lawrence Fletcher, Additional Voices
 Bobby Gaylor as Buford Van Stomm
 Dee Bradley Baker as Perry the Platypus, Additional Voices
 Dan Povenmire as Dr. Doofenshmirtz, Additional Voices
 Jeff "Swampy" Marsh as Major Monogram, Additional Voices

Plot summary
Phineas and Ferb, along with Candace and their father Lawrence, go to an Egyptian-themed movie theater where they see a movie about two archeologists who discover an undead mummy. Phineas and Ferb are inspired to find their own mummy and go out to the basement of the theater, where there is rumored to be a mummy. Candace sees them going off to do this and follows them, hoping to get them in trouble with their father. However, as Phineas and Ferb go searching for the mummy through the basement hallways wearing archeologist hats, they run into what they believe are booby traps; they avoid the traps but Candace ends up getting hit by them all. Eventually, she becomes caught up in raggy toilet paper and cannot talk properly (due to eating stale bubble gum), which leads to the boys mistaking her for the mummy and capturing her.

Meanwhile, Perry goes off to a lake near a beaver dam which Dr. Doofenshmirtz plans on destroying. Once Perry arrives, Doofenshmirtz traps him an indestructible bubble made of "pure evil" and Space Age polymers and explains that he hopes to disassemble the dam using the Woodenator (described as operating like a magnet, except that it attracts wood), in order to raise water levels, making his estate beachfront property. Perry eventually destroys the bubble and begins to fight Doofenshmirtz, until the dam is destroyed and they are sent with the water as it washes into the pipe system.

Doofenshmirtz, Perry, and the lake water reach the pipe lines next to the theater's basement where the boys and Candace are. Perry defeats Doofenshmirtz without catching the attention of the three and the water washes away Candace's toilet paper. When they get outside to meet up with their father, Phineas is dumbfounded as to where their mummy went, but Lawrence thinks he is simply referring to their mother, and also wonders why Candace got all wet. As they ride back home, Ferb explains the process of mummification and Candace says that only the "lucky [mummies]" get the full process.

Production

"Are You My Mummy?" was written by Phineas and Ferb co-creators Dan Povenmire and Jeff "Swampy" Marsh, along with Bobby Gaylor and Martin Olson. It was storyboarded by artists Kyle Baker and Mike Roth, and directed by Povenmire. It was originally broadcast in the United States on Disney Channel on February 15, 2008 as part of the special month-long marathon event "Phineas and Ferb-urary."

Plot elements for the episode date back to the original pitch to The Walt Disney Company for the series produced by Povenmire and Marsh. The pitch was constructed of storyboard reels which were recorded and dubbed over by Povenmire for voices, narration, and sound effects. The initial theme song featured an illustration of Phineas and Ferb, wearing their archeologist hats, discovering Candace, dressed in raggy toilet paper.

"Are You My Mummy" is available on the 2008 DVD compilation Phineas and Ferb: The Fast and the Phineas, along with fellow first season episodes of the series "One Good Scare Ought to Do It!" "The Fast and the Phineas," "Lawn Gnome Beach Party of Terror," "Flop Starz," "Raging Bully," "Lights! Candace! Action!" and "It's About Time!" The song "My Undead Mummy and Me," which is based on the theme song for The Courtship of Eddie's Father, became available in 2009 on the official Phineas and Ferb soundtrack.

Reception
"Are You My Mummy?" received generally favorable reviews from television critics. Reviewers particularly praised the musical number "My Undead Mummy and Me." DVD Verdict reviewer Jim Thomas called it "truly twisted" in his review of The Fast and Phineas. Ed Liu of Toon Zone was critical of the episode and several other early ones from the series, citing them as "way too manic for their own good," but considered the song to be an "amusing video sequence." A Wired magazine review for the series' soundtrack dubbed the song "whimsical," considering it to be a quick improvement from the album's previous track, "Disco Miniature Golfing Queen," from the episode "Put That Putter Away."

References

External links
"Are You My Mummy?" at the Internet Movie Database

2008 American television episodes
Phineas and Ferb episodes